Stephen Roy Holland, OAM (born 31 May 1958) is an Australian former freestyle swimmer of the 1970s who won a bronze medal in the 1500 m freestyle at the 1976 Summer Olympics in Montreal. In a brief and spectacular career, he broke 12 world records and was known as the Super Fish after his coach Laurie Lawrence likened his two-beat kick to the tail of a fish. He was educated at the Anglican Church Grammar School.

Holland made his first headlines as a 15-year-old, when he broke the 1500 m freestyle world record at the Australian Championships. In the process, his 800 m split also broke the 800 m freestyle world record. This qualified him to make his international debut at the 1973 World Aquatics Championships in Belgrade, Yugoslavia, where he again broke both world records en route to the 1500 m freestyle gold medal, setting a time of 15 m 31.85s. Both he and the 2nd classified swimmer (American Rick DeMont) did not stop at the 1500 and continued for 100 m further:

Holland and American Rick DeMont had a stirring contest in the 1500m final at the 1973 world championships in Belgrade. Holland did not hear the bell to indicate two laps to go and kept swimming through 1500m, bringing DeMont through in comic pursuit. The Queenslander turned again after 1600m, stopping only when the yells and bells from officials got his attention. He'd broken the 800m and 1500m world records in the race – and if there was such a thing he'd still have the 1600m world championship record as well.

Following this victory, Holland was awarded the ABC Sportsman of the Year award.

In 1974, Holland won a gold medal in the 1500 m freestyle at the Christchurch Commonwealth Games, leaving the silver medallist from New Zealand, Mark Treffers more than 25 seconds in arrears. Although the time was not a world record, his 800 m split of 8 m 15.88 s bettered his previous 800 m record.

On arrival in Montreal for the 1976 Summer Olympics, Holland had set 12 world records, and was expected by the Australian public to win. However, he departed from his usual strategy of fast-starting, attacking swimming and decided to swim conservatively and outstay his main rivals, the American duo of Bobby Hackett and Brian Goodell. Holland made his move at the 800 m mark, but then found that he was fading in the final 200 m, when Goodell and Hackett overtook him. Although Holland had bettered his previous world record, Goodell surpassed it to take the gold.

Holland later swam the 400 m, finishing fifth behind Goodell, who again set a world record. After the Games, weighed down by the burden of public disappointment, Holland decided at the age of 18 that he was "washed up" and decided to retire from competitive swimming.

Holland was awarded the Order of Australia Medal for services to sport of swimming in 1985, and was inducted into the International Swimming Hall of Fame in 1989.  In 2000, Holland was awarded the Australian Sports Medal.

See also
 List of members of the International Swimming Hall of Fame
 List of Commonwealth Games medallists in swimming (men)
 List of Olympic medalists in swimming (men)
 World record progression 800 metres freestyle
 World record progression 1500 metres freestyle

References

Bibliography

External links
 

1958 births
Living people
Australian male freestyle swimmers
Swimmers from Brisbane
Olympic swimmers of Australia
Swimmers at the 1976 Summer Olympics
Recipients of the Medal of the Order of Australia
Recipients of the Australian Sports Medal
Swimmers at the 1974 British Commonwealth Games
Commonwealth Games gold medallists for Australia
World record setters in swimming
Olympic bronze medalists in swimming
World Aquatics Championships medalists in swimming
People educated at Anglican Church Grammar School
Medalists at the 1976 Summer Olympics
Olympic bronze medalists for Australia
Commonwealth Games medallists in swimming
Sport Australia Hall of Fame inductees
20th-century Australian people
Medallists at the 1974 British Commonwealth Games